Carinodrillia hexagona is a species of sea snail, a marine gastropod mollusk in the family Pseudomelatomidae, the turrids and allies

Description
The length of the shell varies between 15 mm and 25 mm.

The reddish brown shell is sharply pyramidal. The hexagonal whorls are very finely striated, ribbed-tuberculated, the ribs six on each whorl. The sinus is broad.

Distribution
This species occurs in the Pacific Ocean from Mexico to El Salvador.

References

External links
 
 

hexagona
Gastropods described in 1834